Century Casino Caruthersville, formerly Lady Luck Casino Caruthersville, is a  riverboat casino and hotel in Caruthersville, Missouri. It is owned by Vici Properties and operated by Century Casinos. The riverboat is named City of Caruthersville and is permanently docked at a  site that also contains an enclosed pavilion that is used to host various events. 

In 2005, the casino generated $28 million in revenue and $7 million in profits.

History
The casino opened on April 28, 1995 as Casino Aztar. It was built by Aztar Corp. at a cost of $55 million.

Aztar was acquired by Columbia Sussex in January 2007. Columbia Sussex, unable to obtain a casino license in the state, immediately put the property up for sale and threatened to close it down in order to preserve the takeover deal with Aztar. 

In 2007, Isle of Capri Casinos purchased the casino from Columbia Sussex for about $45 million. Casino Aztar Caruthersville was re-branded Lady Luck Casino Caruthersville on June 10, 2008. Isle of Capri was acquired by Eldorado Resorts in 2017.

In 2019, Eldorado sold the casino, along with two other properties, to Century Casinos and Vici Properties. Century bought the casino's operating business for $12 million, while Vici bought the land and buildings for $67 million and leased them to Century. Century stated that the casino would be renamed as Century Casino Caruthersville.

Century purchased a neighboring two-story hotel building in 2021. The hotel was renovated and reopened in 2022 as The Farmstead, with 36 rooms.

See also
List of casinos in Missouri

References

External links
 

Casinos in Missouri
Riverboat casinos
Buildings and structures in Pemiscot County, Missouri
Tourist attractions in Pemiscot County, Missouri
Casinos completed in 1995
1995 establishments in Missouri